Oerlemans is a Dutch toponymic surname indicating an origin in the town of Oerle, North Brabant. Notable Dutch people with the surname include:

 Daniëlle Oerlemans-Overgaag (born 1973), road cyclist, wife of Reinout
 Hans Oerlemans (born 1950), climatologist and glaciologist
 Jeroen Oerlemans (1970–2016), photojournalist
 Marcel Oerlemans (born 1969), football striker
 Natasja Oerlemans (born 1969), Party for the Animals politician
 Reinout Oerlemans (born 1971), actor, director, producer and presenter, husband of Daniëlle
 Yvonne Oerlemans (1945-2012), sculptor, installation artist

References

Dutch-language surnames
Dutch toponymic surnames